Cesare Bartorelli (died 1635) was an Italian Roman Catholic prelate who served as Bishop of Forlì (1602–1635).

Biography
On 20 Nov 1602, Cesare Bartorelli was appointed during the papacy of Pope Clement VIII as Bishop of Forlì.
He served as Bishop of Forlì until his death on 9 Jan 1635.

While bishop, he was the principal co-consecrator of  Gilles de Souvre, Bishop of Comminges (1617).

References

External links 
 (for Chronology of Bishops) 
 (for Chronology of Bishops)  

17th-century Italian Roman Catholic bishops
Bishops appointed by Pope Clement VIII
1635 deaths
Bishops of Forlì